Somalis in the Netherlands are residents or naturalized citizens of the Netherlands who are of Somali ancestry. They form one of the larger Somali communities in Europe and amongst the second largest African foreign community in the Netherlands. The Somalis form the second largest African community in The Netherlands and are one of the fastest growing communities.

Migration history
From 1989 to 1998, the Netherlands was the second-most common European destination for Somali asylum-seekers, only slightly behind the United Kingdom and more than double the total of the next-most common destination, Denmark. However, between 2000 and 2005, there was a significant outflow of Somalis from the Netherlands to the United Kingdom, unofficially estimated to be as large as 20,000 people. Factors mentioned as driving forces behind the exodus included an increase in opposition to Muslim immigration, as exemplified by the rise of Pim Fortuyn, Somali opposition to housing policies which forced them to live scattered in small groups all over various cities rather than in a larger agglomerated community, a restrictive socio-economic environment which, among other things, made it difficult for new arrivals to find work, and the comparative ease of starting a business and acquiring the means to get off social welfare in the UK.

Demography

, Statistics Netherlands estimated the following figures with respect to Dutch people of Somali origin:
15,281 persons of first-generation background (8,831 men, 6,850 women)
6,517 persons of second-generation background (3,322 men, 3,195 women), of which:
543 persons with one parent born in the Netherlands (273 men, 270 women)
5,974 persons with both parents born out of the Netherlands (3,049 men, 2,925 women)
For a total of 21,798 persons (11,753 men, 10,045 women). This represented roughly 9% growth over the 1996 total of 20,060 persons; the composition of the population had changed slightly, with the proportion of the population of second-generation background more than doubling over that time frame. The proportion of men has typically been greater than that of women. Most men are single without dependents, while most women are single mothers with one or more children. This is largely due to being only able to send certain family members to a different country.

Religiosity 

According to a 2018 report, Islam takes a central role in the lives of nearly all Somalis and in many ways their religiosity rose from the 2009 already high levels.

Notable people

Yasmine Allas, actress and writer
Hussein Suleiman, fashion designer, CEO of Daily Paper
Abdi Nageeye, athlete
 Liban Abdulahi

References

Notes

Sources

Further reading

External links
Federation of Somali Associations in the Netherlands - FSAN

African diaspora in the Netherlands
Islam in the Netherlands
 
 
Ethnic groups in the Netherlands
Netherlands
Muslim communities in Europe